One Day is an upcoming British television series based on the 2009 novel of the same name by David Nicholls.

Cast
 Ambika Mod as Emma Morley	
 Leo Woodall as Dexter Mayhew
 Eleanor Tomlinson as Sylvie
 Essie Davis as Alison
 Jonny Weldon as Ian
 Brendan Quinn as Callum
 Billie Gadsdon as Jasmine

Production

Development
Netflix ordered a new One Day adaptation in November 2021 from Drama Republic. The writers' room is being led by Nicole Taylor and consists of Anna Jordan, Vinay Patel, and Bijan Sheibani. Executive producers include Nicholls and Taylor as well as Roanna Benn and Jude Liknaitzky. Molly Manners is attached to direct the series.

Actress Ambika Mod said in November 2022 that the series would cover more of the novel than the 2011 film adaptation.

Casting
In June 2022, it was announced Ambika Mod and Leo Woodall would star as the leads Emma and Dexter respectively. Eleanor Tomlinson and Essie Davis joined the cast as Sylvie and Alison respectively, as announced in July and October.

Filming
Principal photography began in London on 4 July 2022 before moving to Edinburgh on 18 July. Filming took place on location at the University of Edinburgh's Old College, as well as the city centre, West End, and Old Town.

References

External links
 

Upcoming drama television series
Upcoming Netflix original programming
2020s British romance television series
2020s college television series
British college television series
English-language Netflix original programming
Television shows based on British novels
Television series set in 1988
Television shows set in Edinburgh
Television shows filmed in Scotland
Television series by Universal Television